The Truck, Utility, ¼-Ton, 4×4, M151 or simply M151 was the successor to the Korean War M38 and M38A1 jeep Light Utility Vehicles. The M151 had an integrated body design which offered a little more space than prior jeeps, and featured all-around independent suspension with coil springs. It has since been replaced by the larger AM General HMMWV in most utility roles in frontline use. With some M151A2 units still in U.S. military service in 1999, the M151 series achieved a longer run of service than that of the World War II/Korean War-era MB/GPW, M38, and M38A1 series combined.

History 
In 1951 Ford Motor Company was awarded the contract to design a ¼-ton 4×4 truck to replace the aging M38 and M38A1 model jeeps. The M151 was developed to specifications and guidance of the U.S. Army's Ordnance Tank Automotive Command. Design started in 1951 and testing and prototyping lasted through most of the fifties. Although the M151 was developed and initially produced by Ford, production contracts for the M151A2 were later also awarded to Kaiser and AM General Corp, a subsidiary of AMC.

Design 

Although the M151 mostly retained the same basic layout and dimensions of its predecessors, it was for all intents and purposes a completely new design. Unlike previous jeep designs, whose structure consisted of a steel tub bolted onto a separate steel frame, the M151 utilized an integrated frame design, which integrated the box frame rails and the sheet-steel body into a unibody structure. Eliminating the separate frame gave the M151 slightly more ground clearance, while at the same time lowering the center of gravity. Although the vehicle's dimensions were only slightly enlarged — the 85 inch wheelbase was 4 inches longer than its predecessor, or 5 inches compared to the Willys MB, and the width was increased 3 inches — combined with the improved space efficiency of the integrated body design, the vehicle was a bit roomier than previous jeeps, while retaining the same light weight.

Another area improved upon in the M151 was the suspension. Dispensing with the rigid live axles in the front and rear that all previous military jeeps used (a layout still used on modern day Jeeps, such as the Jeep CJ and Wrangler), the M151 was instead equipped with independent suspension and coil springs. This made it capable of high-speed, cross-country travel, while boasting high maneuverability and agility. The new suspension also had the added benefit of providing a more comfortable ride.

Due to copyright and trademark issues, the M151 did not feature Jeep's distinctive seven vertical slot grille, instead, a horizontal grille was used.

Handling problems 

Unlike other military transports, such as the WWII and Korean War-era Jeeps and Dodge and Chevrolet transport trucks, the M151 was never widely released into the civilian market. This was partly because it did not meet federal highway safety standards for civilian vehicles, and because of a series of rollover accidents. While the high pivot rear swing axle geometry on the M151A1 was responsible for the rollovers, injuries and fatalities, the industry (Ford and the Army) claimed that they were primarily due to driver errors, with operators unprepared for the increased performance compared to the Jeeps, which it replaced. The swing axle rear design was prone to significant camber changes when subjected to cornering, resulting in the rear lifting, the inside wheel tucking under which often led to a vehicle rollover.  Steering input as commonly found in a high-speed emergency avoidance maneuvers or hard cornering, was a recipe for disaster. The vehicle's tendency to lose control was reduced when there was weight in the rear, so drivers would often place an ammunition box filled with sand under the rear seat when no other load was being carried. The box could simply be emptied or abandoned when the extra weight was not needed. Recoilless rifle carrier models were especially prone to rollover accidents due to their stiffer rear springs and were typically subjected to severe speed restrictions any time the gun was not aboard.

Ford Motor Company designed the M151A1 beginning in 1951. By 1965 the world knew of the problems with swing axles (e.g. Unsafe at Any Speed by Ralph Nader). Nevertheless, when, in 1969, an automotive engineer at the Human Engineering Lab at Aberdeen Proving Ground wrote a report that included: 1) an analysis that showed the high pivot swing axle in the M151A1 was inherently unstable under cornering, 2) retrofits that had proven to solve the problem on Corvairs, VWs, and Formula Vees and, 3) ways of designing a replacement. The Director of the Human Engineering Lab rejected this report and when the solutions were forwarded to the Ford engineers they rejected them as well.

The handling issues were eventually resolved by a redesign of the rear suspension, introduced in the M151A2 model. However, due to liability concerns, the U.S. Department of Defense deemed all M151 series vehicles "unsafe for public highway use", limiting their public use. Continuing problems with vehicle roll-overs into the 1980s led the U.S. military to retrofit many M151 series vehicles with the "Roll over protection structure" (ROPS), a roll cage intended to protect both front and rear seat passengers.

Service 

First put into service in the early 1960s, the M151 played an active part in American military operations well into the 1980s, when it was phased out in favor of the HMMWV. Despite its official replacement, the M151 had some distinct advantages over its much larger and heavier successor, like being small enough to fit inside a CH-53 heavy transport helicopter.

Various models of the M-151 have seen successful military service in 15 different NATO countries and M151s were sold to many countries, including Canada, Denmark, the United Kingdom and non-NATO countries like Egypt, Lebanon, Israel, the Philippines, and Pakistan. Currently, the M151 is used by over 100 countries worldwide.

Post-military use 

In the late 1980s the M151s began being phased out of service in favour of the HMMWV. A few (perhaps 1,000) were sold via Government Surplus auctions, and those that were not sold via Foreign Military Sales (FMS) overseas were cut into four pieces and scrapped. However some individuals were able to buy these "quartered" M151s and simply weld the four sections back together, and rebuilt them into drivable condition. Some vehicles sold in the United States were simply cut in half, some of which were simply welded back together and driven. Additionally, beginning in the late 1990s a few companies dealing in Military surplus items bought M151s from some of the foreign governments that received the vehicles via FMS for reconditioning and further sales.

The Growler

Growler Manufacturing and Engineering designs and sells the Internally Transportable Light Strike Vehicle based on the M151 drivetrain. The Internally Transportable Light Strike Vehicle is intended to replace Fast Attack Vehicle variants of the M151, and is reduced in size to fit into the V-22 Osprey tiltrotor transport. Although originally intended to utilize the M151 drivetrain, the result is an all new design and contains no M151 parts or design elements.

Variants

 M151 (1960) – Original, standard version of the clean-sheet, Ford designed, all new jeep. Because of its simple independent rear suspension, it had a dangerous tendency to flip over when cornered too aggressively by unaware drivers. The cheap swing-axle rear suspension design (like that of the original VW Beetle and Chevrolet Corvair), would result in large rear-wheel camber angle changes, and could cause drastic oversteer and a subsequent roll-over.
 M151A1 (1964) – Second version: minor changes in the rear suspension, mostly aimed at allowing the vehicle to carry heavier loads. Addition of turn signals to front fenders. The essentials of the rear suspension remained unchanged and the same applies to the handling problems in corners.
 M151A1C – The M151A1C equipped with a 106 mm recoilless rifle on a pedestal-mount. Capable of carrying six rounds of ammunition and weapon tools. Including the driver, it provides space for two men and has a cruising range of 442 km or 275 miles.
 M151A1D – Tactical nuclear variant. This was an M151A1C modified to mount the Davy Crockett Atomic Warhead Launcher (in parallel development with a similarly equipped M38A1 and other tactical vehicles).
 M718 – Front-line ambulance variant with an extended rear body to enable the transport of wounded patients on litters. Crewed by two — a driver and a medic, it could carry three litters. Notably, although the M718 is larger than an M151 in all three dimensions – its greater length, width and height resulted from only minimal changes to the standard M151 design — retaining both the same wheelbase and track width unchanged. The spare wheel was moved from the rear to the side, to allow the rear body extensions, but also resulting in the increase in width. The ambulance "body" of the M718 consisted mostly just of taller bows, and a longer, taller, canvas top. The changes to the body and chassis, compared to the base M151 were remarkably minimal, considering its predecessor, the M170 jeep ambulance, had received a full  wheelbase stretch from the base M38A1 jeep.
 M151A2 (1968) – The A2 fielded a significantly revised rear suspension that greatly improved safety in fast cornering. The M151 now had Semi-trailing arm suspension. Many smaller upgrades including improved turn signals. The A2 can be identified by the large combination turn signal/blackout lights on the front fenders, which also had been modified to mount the larger lights, as opposed to earlier A1's that had flat front fenders.
 M151A2 TOW – tube-launched, optically tracked, wire-guided (TOW) anti-tank missile variant.
 M718A1 – Front-line ambulance variant that featured an extended rear body to allow the transport of litters.
 M825 – Variant with M40 106 mm recoilless rifle mounted on rear. It had racks in the cargo bed to carry 4 shells.
 M1051 – Firefighting variant which saw exclusive use by the Marine Corps.
 MRC108 – Forward Air Control variant, with multi-band communications equipment.
 Fast Attack Vehicles
 M151A2 FAV – Fast Assault Vehicle variant designed to be carried inside a CH-53 helicopter. Modification mainly involves adding a combination radiator grille armor plate and spare tire carrier, a field radio bracket between the front seats, roll bars or roll-cage, and high-beam lights. It has a heavy weapons pedestal mount post mounted on the rear deck (capable of carrying a Browning M2HB, Mark 19 Automatic Grenade Launcher or TOW II Missile). The rear bustles had brackets to mount large storage baskets and the front bustles had brackets to mount small storage baskets for fuel jerry cans or single ammo boxes.
 Marine FAV Mk I "Super Jeep": Fast Attack Vehicle. Models originally had a flat black paint job and a velcro-fastened cloth "blackout panel" that covered the dashboard gauges. The front-mounted roll bar, which replaced the front folding windshield, was made from threaded heavy-gauge pipe.
 Marine FAV Mk II: Fast Attack Vehicle. Models originally had a MERDC "woodland" camouflage paint job and a welded roll-bar that was reinforced with two angled support braces of heavy-gauge welded pipe between the front seats. Had two high-beam lights mounted under the top of the rollbar. Highly customized by the units converting it, leading to numerous unique modifications.
 Airborne FAV (AKA Ranger FAV): Fast Attack Vehicle. Has a forward-facing M60 GPMG or M240 MAG GPMG in a M32 45° weapons mount welded to the dashboard on the front passenger side, a horizontal storage box containing an AT-4 Anti-Tank Rocket, and a vertical storage rack behind the front seats that holds 8 to 10 M72 LAW Rockets. The rear bustles can mount locker baskets that can each contain 4 × M2/M2A1 ammo boxes for the main gun and the front bustles can contain single ammo boxes for the M60.
 Air Force FAV: Has a roll cage and a 360° ring mount over the rear seat. This model was designed by Marine Sgt. David Ferry and saw service with the MEUs and other Special Operations units. It got the nickname of "Air Force FAV" from a famous picture of U.S. Air Force Maj. Gen. William S. Hinton Jr., commander of Joint Task Force Shining Hope, getting out of one.

Users

 
 
 
 
 
 
 
 
 
 
 
 
 
 
 
 
 
 
 
 
 
 <ref name="BDAR"/

See also

 FMC XR311
 G-numbers
 M416 trailer
 Willys FAMAE Corvo
 Austin Champ
 UAZ-469

Notes

References

 
 
 
 
 
 
 
 
 
 
 
 U.S Army Ordnance Corps Supply Catalog G838

External links

  M151 series at Olive-Drab.com
  M151 series at Globalsecurity.com
  M151 series Technical Manuals at imfmotorpool.com
 
 

Military trucks of the United States
Ford vehicles
Military light utility vehicles
Military vehicles introduced in the 1960s